Heikki Hietanen (30 August 1914 – 27 May 2000) was a Finnish freestyle swimmer. He competed in two events at the 1936 Summer Olympics.

References

External links
 

1914 births
2000 deaths
Finnish male freestyle swimmers
Olympic swimmers of Finland
Swimmers at the 1936 Summer Olympics
Swimmers from Helsinki